Subete a mi Moto is a Mexican telenovela produced by TV Azteca in 2002. Created by Veronica Suarez and Eric Vonn. The protagonists include Vanessa Acosta, Mark Tacher, Sandra Echeverria, Michel Brown, Alejandra Urdaín and Adrián Cue, and the antagonistic interpretation by Bárbara Mori, Jorge Luis Pila, Susana Alexander and Vanessa Villela.

Plot
It is the story of four young people with different personalities, but the four looking for love.

Mari Jo (Maria Jose), Mariana, and her two half sisters: Cecilia and Renata, seek to survive their family problems, trying to share a father, being daughters of different mothers, Harriet and Laura respectively, are both good women, but they have very different points of views, for reasons of generation and personality.

Mariana and Renata, half-sisters, will fall in love with Richard and fight for him until the end. Not to mention that a third person, beautiful and evil, manipulates them into fighting each other.

That person is Nelly, the jealous cousin of the girls, who together with her mother, Carmen, and the great villain, Carlos, will make life difficult for the rest, engaging in piracy.

Ernesto, the father of the sisters, is the director of a major label, he is desolated after realizing it was not true that Harriet, his first wife, betrayed him, and after 20 years he found out the lies Angustias , his former mother in law, created. His two daughters from his first marriage believe he abandoned them. But that's not the worst.

Ernesto, now married to Laura and with two daughters, realizes upon seeing Harriet again he still loves her, but also loves his current wife. Can you love two women at once, but in different ways ?.

Mauricio, a friend of Richard and Motocross champion, is in love with Renata who always treats him badly.

Marijo is the classic pretty girl that does not show it so she will be seen for her mind and not her looks. MariJo falls for a man almost 10 years older than she is, causing a series of conflicts both by the age difference, and by the way she is. At one point in history, Marijo and Joseph will compete to be the best broadcasters, despite the love they have.

Cecilia, the youngest of the sisters, whose conflict is to know what career to choose after graduating from high school, does not realize the great love Cuco, the friendly shopkeeper's nephew who came to study psychology at the capital, has for her and whose Platonic dream, is to become a singer.

But things will not be easy for Cuco because Michelangelo, the right hand of piracy czar Carlos, will want to possess her at all costs.

Ernesto, determined that his four daughters get along, suggested that he would live alone with the four girls, creating situations sentimental, emotional, and comedic that will make this somewhat predictable soap opera.

Cast
 Vanessa Acosta .... Mari Jo (Protagonist)
 Mark Tacher .... José (Protagonist)
 Sandra Echeverría .... Mariana (Protagonist)
 Michel Brown .... Ricardo (Protagonist)
 Bárbara Mori .... Nelly (Main female antagonist)
 Jorge Luis Pila .... Carlos (Main male antagonist)
 Vanessa Villela .... Renata (Antagonist)
 Alejandra Urdaín .... Cecilia (Protagonist)
 Adrián Cue .... Mauricio (Protagonist)
 Gabriela Roel .... Laura (Co-Protagonist)
 Fernando Ciangherotti .... Ernesto (Co-Protagonist)
 Monserrat Ontiveros .... Enriqueta
 Alejandro Gaytán .... Guillermo
 Christian Cataldi .... Miguel Ángel
 José Julián .... Cuco
 Carmen Delgado .... Carmen
 Alberto Casanova .... Teodoro
 Susana Alexander .... Doña Angustias (Antagonist)
 Enrique Novi .... Federico Guerra
 Enrique Becker .... Don Mickey
 Paola Núñez .... Leticia
 Irma Infante .... Bertha
 Carmen Zavaleta .... Sarita
 Gabriela Hassel .... Emilia
 Bertha Kaim .... Vanessa
 Altair Jarabo .... Gaby
 Gina Morett .... Mercedes
 Ramiro Orci .... Don Chucho
 José Ramón Escoriza .... Door-man
 César Cansdales .... Bartender
 Araceli Chavira .... Lupita
 Nubia Martí .... Tía Susana
 Eva Prado .... Elena
 Alma Martínez .... Chelita
 León Michel .... Rodolfo
 Luis Arrieta .... Jorge
 Rodrigo Abed
 Raquel Bustos

Theme song

Subete A Mi Moto

Singer
Menudo

Writer
F. Diaz
C. Villa

Producer
Claudio Yarto

References

2002 telenovelas
2002 Mexican television series debuts
2002 Mexican television series endings
Mexican telenovelas
Spanish-language telenovelas
TV Azteca telenovelas